The Lockean proviso is a feature of John Locke's labor theory of property which states that whilst individuals have a right to homestead private property from nature by working on it, they can do so only "at least where there is enough, and as good, left in common for others".

Locke's formulation

Overview 
The phrase Lockean proviso was coined by libertarian political philosopher Robert Nozick in Anarchy, State, and Utopia. It is based on the ideas elaborated by John Locke in his Second Treatise of Government, namely that self-ownership allows a person the freedom to mix his or her labor with natural resources, converting common property into private property. Locke concludes that people need to be able to protect the resources they are using to live on their property and that this is a natural right. Nozick used this idea to form his Lockean proviso which governs the initial acquisition of property in a society, but in order for his ideas of ownership of property to get off the ground and be cogent he devised the criterion to determine what makes property acquisition just, which is the proviso. The proviso says that although every appropriation of property is a diminution of another's rights to it, it is acceptable as long as it does not make anyone worse off than they would have been without any private property.

Locke's proviso has been used by Georgists, socialists, and Basic Income advocates to point to land acquisition as illegitimate without compensation.  In Georgism, the possession of land is proper only so long as the market rent is paid to the relevant community.  If a plot of land has a positive rent, that implies that there is not land of similar quality freely available to others.

Libertarians of the modern Austrian School and anarcho-capitalist traditions such as Murray Rothbard have accepted Locke's other views on property whilst rejecting the Lockean proviso. Anarcho-Capitalist economist Walter Block rejects the Lockean proviso instead arguing for the Blockian Proviso because he contends that land that completely stops access to non-homesteaded land is incompatible with the logic of homesteading

French researcher Ai-Thu Dang has criticized Nozick's reading of the Lockean proviso, saying it denatures its meaning, especially Locke's "articulation to moral rules governing enrichment".

Socialist critics of the Proviso such as G.A. Cohen point to the issue that the Proviso does not take into account previously existing inequalities. Cohen describes the Lockean Proviso's first-come-first-serve approach as "morally dubious". He uses the example of someone claiming a beach as "their own" and charging admission in exchange for lifeguarding service. This would satisfy the proviso because it doesn't make anyone's life "worse" but it fails to consider how much better off everyone would be if someone owned the beach and charged only 50 cents for better service. He continues that this superior alternative is never considered under Nozick’s proviso.

Karl Widerquist and Grant McCall argue that even weak versions of the proviso, such as the one used by Nozick, are unfulfilled by contemporary societies. The poorest people today, even in wealthy nations, are worse off than they could reasonably expect to be in a stateless hunter-gatherer band that treats the environment as commons that cannot be owned by anyone. They write, "Establishing hunter-gatherer quality-of-life as the baseline for comparison sets an extremely low bar. The tragedy of state societies today is that for all their wealth and achievement they have so consistently failed to surpass that bar."

See also 

 Classical liberalism
 David Gauthier (cf. the Gauthierian interpretation of the Lockean proviso)
 Estate in land
 Geolibertarianism
 Georgism
 Land (economics)
 Land law
 Land reform
 Land value tax
 Law of equal liberty

References 

Classical liberalism
John Locke
Property